Johnson Park is a census-designated place (CDP) in eastern Shasta County, California, United States. Its population is 686 as of the 2020 census. It was first listed as a CDP prior to the 2020 census.

References 

Census-designated places in Shasta County, California
Census-designated places in California